This list is of the Natural Monuments of Japan within the Prefecture of Kōchi.

National Natural Monuments
As of 1 April 2021, twenty-eight Natural Monuments have been designated, including five *Special Natural Monuments; Miune-Tenguzuka Miyama kumazasa and Rhododendron tschonoskii Communities spans the prefectural borders with Tokushima.

Prefectural Natural Monuments
As of 1 March 2021, forty-two Natural Monuments have been designated at a prefectural level.

Municipal Natural Monuments
As of 1 May 2020, two hundred and thirty-one Natural Monuments have been designated at a municipal level.

See also
 Cultural Properties of Japan
 Parks and gardens in Kōchi Prefecture
 List of Places of Scenic Beauty of Japan (Kōchi)
 List of Historic Sites of Japan (Kōchi)

References

External links
  Cultural Properties in Kōchi Prefecture

 Kochi
Kōchi Prefecture